Christmas with Scotty McCreery is the Christmas album by season ten American Idol winner Scotty McCreery. The album was released on October 16, 2012, in the United States by Mercury Nashville.  The album was certified Gold on November 26, 2012.

Background
In July 2012, Scotty McCreery revealed that he was working on a Christmas album.  He indicated that he had always wanted to make a Christmas album, and had talked about it for about a year before it was given the go-ahead by his label. The album contains many of the standard Christmas songs, as well as two original Christmas songs - "Christmas in Heaven" and "Christmas Comin' Round Again".  He described "Christmas in Heaven" as his favorite song on the album. McCreery revealed that he was writing a song called "Christmas in Heaven" about his grandfather, who died while he was getting ready for the album, but received a song with the same title and opted to record that instead.

The album was produced by Mark Bright, who was also the producer of McCreery's first album, Clear as Day.  The Christmas album was released on October 16, 2012 in the United States. It was included in the Scotty McCreery QVC Bundle, which also contains Clear as Day, and was  released on October 23 through QVC.

Critical reception

The album received generally positive reviews by the critics.  Stephen Thomas Erlewine of Allmusic thought that to release a Christmas album at this point of his career "may be a tad speedy but a festive collection is a softball pitch up the middle for McCreery, one that the cornpone singer can hit clear out of the park."  Billy Duke of Taste of Country considered it a "consistent project that takes few chances, but offers 11 pleasant recordings to easily slip into one's yearly holiday playlist." In similar vein, Matt Bjorke of Roughstock thought the album is "largely as warm and familiar as a cup of Hot Cocoa. That is, it's not the kind of groundbreaking all-new Christmas recording but it is well-made and should be an easy addition to any Christmas music fan's collection of yuletide music."

Chart and sales performance
Christmas with Scotty McCreery debuted at No. 4 on the Billboard 200, with first week sales of 41,000 copies. It also charted in No. 2 in the Top Country Albums and No. 1 in the Top Holiday Albums charts.  As of December 2013, the album has sold 382,000 copies in the US.

The Scotty McCreery QVC Bundle released through QVC sold 5,000 copies the first week and reached No. 93 on the Billboard 200.

Track listing

Personnel
Adapted from liner notes.

 Eric Darken - percussion (all tracks except 2 & 10)
 Aubrey Haynie - fiddle (tracks 1, 3, 5)
 Wes Hightower - background vocals (tracks 2, 3, 5-8, 10, 11)
 Charlie Judge - string arrangements (track 9), strings (track 9)
 Paul Leim - drums
 Tony Lucido - bass guitar
 Scotty McCreery - lead vocals
 Brent Mason - electric guitar
 Jimmy Nichols - keyboards, piano
 Danny Rader - acoustic guitar
 Jennifer Wrinkle - background vocals (tracks 2, 3, 5-8, 10, 11)
 Jonathan Yudkin - arco bass (tracks 6, 7), cello (tracks 6, 7), harp (tracks 6, 7), string arrangements (tracks 6, 7), viola (tracks 6, 7), violin (tracks 6, 7)

Charts and certifications

Weekly Charts

Year-End Charts

Certifications

References

External links

Mercury Nashville albums
Scotty McCreery albums
2012 Christmas albums
Christmas albums by American artists
Country Christmas albums
Albums produced by Mark Bright (record producer)
19 Recordings albums